{{DISPLAYTITLE:C59H84N16O12}}
The molecular formula C59H84N16O12 (molar mass: 1209.40 g/mol, exact mass: 1208.6455 u) may refer to:

 Lecirelin
 Leuprorelin, or leuprolide

Molecular formulas